Double Barrel is an album made in collaboration between American rapper Torae and Canadian hip hop producer Marco Polo. The album was released on June 2, 2009 by Duck Down Music Inc. It was preceded by Marco Polo's critically well-received debut album Port Authority (2007), and Torae's inaugural release Daily Conversation (2008) on which Polo has produced three tracks.

The album was executive produced by both artists, along with DJ Linx, Shylow of First Division, and Theo Bark. Associate producers include Duck Down founders Drew "Dru-Ha" Friedman and Kenyatta "Buckshot" Blake. The album features guest appearances from DJ Premier, Lil Fame of M.O.P., Rock of Heltah Skeltah, Guilty Simpson, Masta Ace, Sean Price, S-Roc of BrassMunk, and Saukrates. Scratches are provided by DJ Revolution, DJ Linx, and Shylow. The album was recorded by Marco Polo at The Krib, and was mixed and mastered by Ricardo Gutierrez at Stadium Red in New York City.

The album was preceded by the 12-inch single "Double Barrel" featuring DJ Revolution, with B-side "Hold Up" featuring Masta Ace and Sean Price, and "Combat Drills". The track "Danger" is featured on the soundtrack of the 2013 superhero action comedy film Kick-Ass 2 as well as a backdrop music for the 1st Mission of Call of Duty Modern Warfare 2.

Critical response

Upon its release, the album was met with generally favorable reviews from music critics. Amanda Bassa of HipHopDX wrote, "Low points will be hard to find on Double Barrel, and the project offers up something for those craving the boom bap as well as something that feels relevant in the present." Addi "Mindbender" Stewart of KevinNottingham.com felt that "conceptually and ultimately, not much new ground is broken here. But alternately, and equally importantly, [Marco Polo & Torae] carry on certain hip hop traditions faithfully, yet in their own signature way". The reviewer claimed that the album would "essentially be thought of at as one of the more satisfying offerings of east coast rap music in 2009." Pedro "DJ Complejo" Hernandez, writing for RapReviews.com, remarked that Double Barrel is a "banging album full of unadulterated hip-hop." He believed that "Marco Polo should surely become a hot commodity with his brand of head banging boom bap beats." He also complimented Torae as "a solid emcee" because of  his ability to tell stories, his "brash" braggadocio, and his passion which "matches that of the best emcees". Additionally, he mentioned that the Brooklyn rapper can really showcase his talent when he has "the right production behind him". Similarly, Sobhi Youssef of Sputnikmusic wrote, "The production team excels largely in providing an acceptable sonic backdrop for Torae to rhyme over". However, he opined that "without this (or even DJ Revolution's tasteful cuts on a few joints), he is nearly indistinguishable from other hardcore bent tri-state rappers." He then asserted that "this happens with startling (but welcome) frequency as Rocc [sic], Guilty Simpson, Masta Ace, and Sean Price steal the spotlight for their respective featured verses, adding a lot to the track."

In his mixed review for The Smoking Section, TS obversed the record's drawback is "the basic business model of things", explaining, "Torae spends the majority of the LP denouncing industry politics while Marco Polo's production tends to blend together with seemingly the same bassline and song tempos by the album's midway point." XXL reviewer Jonathan Bonanno noted that in spite of "lackluster records" such as "Word Play" and "Party Crashers", Double Barrel is in overall "a solid offering" and claimed that "Marco Polo & Torae's potential as a formidable producer/ MC team is without question—even if they never get the mass appeal."

Track listing

Credits and personnel
Credits for Double Barrel adapted from the album's liner notes.

 Theo Bark – co-executive producer
 Kenyatta "Buckshot" Blake – associate producer
 Marco "Marco Polo" Bruno – composer, engineer, executive producer, primary artist, producer
 Jamal "Rock" Bush – composer, featured artist
 Torae Carr – composer, executive producer, primary artist, rap vocals
 Duval "Masta Ace" Clear – composer, featured artist
 DJ Linx – executive producer, scratching
 DJ Revolution – featured artist, scratching
 Drew "Dru-Ha" Friedman – associate producer
 FWMJ – artwork
 Jamal "Lil Fame" Grinnage – composer, featured artist
 Ricardo Gutierrez – mixing, mastering
 Dwayne S.M. "S-Roc" King – composer, featured artist
 Chris "DJ Premier" Martin – composer, featured artist
 Robert Adam Mayer – photography
 Sean Price – composer, featured artist
 Shylow – co-executive producer, scratching
 Byron "Guilty Simpson" Simpson – composer, featured artist
 Skrilla – artwork [additional]
 Karl Amani "Saukrates" Wailoo – composer, featured artist

Chart position

References

2009 albums
Marco Polo (producer) albums
Torae albums
Albums produced by Marco Polo
Hip hop albums by American artists
Collaborative albums